Eastern coneflower is a common name for several plants and may refer to:

Echinacea purpurea, with purple flowers
Rudbeckia fulgida, with yellow or orange flowers